Kalkhuran (also Romanized as Kalkhūrān) is a village in Hir Rural District, Hir District, Ardabil County, Ardabil Province, Iran. At the 2006 census, its population was 390, in 70 families.

References 

Towns and villages in Ardabil County